The Dresden Sun is an upcoming American science-fiction heist movie. Written and directed by Michael Ryan, the film is produced by Archetype Pictures and starring Christina Ricci, Steven Ogg, Linus Roache, Samantha Win and Mena Suvari.

Synopsis
A brilliant, principled mercenary but with a traumatic past works on an inside job to steal “the sphere”, a valued asset from Peredor Corporation but the heist goes wrong. Meanwhile, The C & Earth corporation is hoping to use a scientist’s project to gain dominance. Whilst an analyst at the powerful investment firm Mutual One is caught between deadly corporate rivals, financial fraud, technological espionage, and ends up on the run from a psychopathic military contractor.

Cast
 Christina Ricci as Dr. Dresden Corliss
 Steven Ogg as Crilenger
 Linus Roache as Malik
 Mena Suvari as Asha
 Samantha Win as Z

Production
As well as writing and  directing, Michael Ryan also produced the film alongside Tyler Lockamy at Archetype Pictures. Ryan described the film as allegory, which has themes including “corporatocracy, interdimensional reality, grief, arrested development, and apostasy.”

Casting
Samantha Win was announced to the cast playing Z in June 2021. In November 2021 Cristina Ricci and Steven Ogg were revealed to have been cast as Dr Dresden and mercenary Crilenger, respectively. In January 2022 Mena Suvari was added to the cast.  A month later Linus Roache was confirmed as Malik, a psychopath military contractor.

Filming
Principal photography took place in
northern California from
January 2022. Sabrina Jurisich, Shasta and Tehama Counties Film Commissioner, was reported to have remarked that the eight-week shoot was the largest single production to have ever been in Shasta County. Filming locations included Redding, the Redding Civic Auditorium and Redding City Hall. Reportedly chosen in-part for its “scenic backdrops”, Shasta County was said to have been chosen for 15
separate filming locations for the film.

Release
Global sales on the picture are being handled by VMI Worldwide.

References

External links

Upcoming films
Films shot in California
American heist films
2020s heist films
American science fiction action films
21st-century science fiction films
2020s science fiction films